Senator Gerard may refer to:

Sumner Gerard (1916–2005), Montana State Senate
Susan Gerard (born 1950), Arizona State Senate